Andy Phillips may refer to:

Andy Phillips (baseball) (born 1977), American baseball coach
Andy Phillips (center) (born 1991), American football player
Andy Phillips (kicker) (born 1989), American football player
Andy Phillips (speedway rider) (born 1968), English speedway rider

See also
Andrew Phillips (disambiguation), multiple people